Sinusitis, also known as rhinosinusitis, is inflammation of the mucous membranes that line the sinuses resulting in symptoms that may include thick nasal mucus, a plugged nose, and facial pain. Other signs and symptoms may include fever, headaches, a poor sense of smell, sore throat, a feeling that phlegm is oozing out from the back of the nose to the throat along with a necessity to clear the throat frequently and frequent attacks of cough. 

Generally sinusitis starts off as a common viral infection like common cold. This infection generally subsides within 5 to 7 days. During this time the nasal structures can swell and facilitate the stagnation of fluids in sinuses that leads to acute sinusitis which lasts from 6th day of the infection to 15th day. From the 15th day to 45th day of the infection comes the subacute stage followed by chronic stage. Whenever a chronic stage patient's immunity takes a hit the infection moves to "acute on sinusitis" stage and moves back to chronic when the immunity is up.

Sinusitis usually occurs in individuals with underlying conditions like allergies, or structural problems in the nose and in people with lesser immunity against bacteria by birth. Most cases are caused by a viral infection. Recurrent episodes are more likely in persons with asthma, cystic fibrosis, and poor immune function. In early stages an ENT doctor confirms sinusitis using nasal endoscopy. Diagnostic imaging is not usually needed in acute stage unless complications are suspected. In chronic cases, confirmatory testing is recommended by either direct visualization or computed tomography.

Some cases may be prevented by hand washing, avoiding smoking, and immunization. Pain killers such as naproxen, nasal steroids, and nasal irrigation may be used to help with symptoms. Recommended initial treatment for acute sinusitis is watchful waiting. If symptoms do not improve in 7–10 days or get worse, then an antibiotic may be used or changed. In those in whom antibiotics are used, either amoxicillin or amoxicillin/clavulanate is recommended first line, with amoxicillin/clavulanate being superior to amoxicillin alone but with more side effects. Surgery may occasionally be used in people with chronic disease or in someone who is not responding to medicines as per doctor's expectation.

Sinusitis is a common condition. It affects between about 10 and 30 percent of people each year in the United States and Europe. Chronic sinusitis affects about 12.5% of people. Treatment of sinusitis in the United States results in more than 11 billion in costs. The unnecessary and ineffective treatment of viral sinusitis with antibiotics is common.

Signs and symptoms
Headache, facial pain, or pressure of a dull, constant, or aching sort over the affected sinuses is common with both acute and chronic stages of sinusitis.  This pain is usually localized to the involved sinus and may worsen when the affected person bends over or lies down.  Pain often starts on one side of the head and progresses to both sides.
Acute sinusitis may be accompanied by a thick nasal discharge that is usually green in color, and may contain pus or blood. Often, a localized headache or toothache is present, and these symptoms distinguish a sinus-related headache from other types of headaches, such as tension and migraine headaches. Another way to distinguish between toothache and sinusitis is that the pain in sinusitis is usually worsened by tilting the head forward and with the Valsalva maneuver.

Other symptoms associated with acute rhinosinusitis include cough, fatigue, hyposmia, anosmia and ear fullness or pressure.

Sinus infections can also cause middle-ear problems due to the congestion of the nasal passages. This can be demonstrated by dizziness, "a pressurized or heavy head", or vibrating sensations in the head. Postnasal drip is also a symptom of chronic rhinosinusitis.

Halitosis (bad breath) is often stated to be a symptom of chronic rhinosinusitis; however, gold-standard breath analysis techniques have not been applied. Theoretically,  several possible mechanisms of both objective and subjective halitosis may be involved.

A 2005 review suggested that most "sinus headaches" are migraines. The confusion occurs in part because migraine involves activation of the trigeminal nerves, which innervate both the sinus region and the meninges surrounding the brain. As a result, accurately determining the site from which the pain originates is difficult. People with migraines do not typically have the thick nasal discharge that is a common symptom of a sinus infection.

Symptoms of chronic sinusitis may include nasal congestion, facial pain, headache, night-time coughing, an increase in previously minor or controlled asthma symptoms, general malaise, thick green or yellow discharge, feeling of facial fullness or tightness that may worsen when bending over, dizziness, aching teeth, and bad breath. Often, chronic sinusitis can lead to anosmia, the loss of the sense of smell.

By location
The four paired paranasal sinuses are the frontal, ethmoidal, maxillary, and sphenoidal sinuses. The ethmoidal sinuses are further subdivided into anterior and posterior ethmoid sinuses, the division of which is defined as the basal lamella of the middle nasal concha. In addition to the severity of disease, discussed below, sinusitis can be classified by the sinus cavity it affects:
 Maxillary – can cause pain or pressure in the maxillary (cheek) area (e.g., toothache, or headache) (J01.0/J32.0)
 Frontal – can cause pain or pressure in the frontal sinus cavity (located above the eyes), headache, particularly in the forehead (J01.1/J32.1)
 Ethmoidal – can cause pain or pressure pain between/behind the eyes, the sides of the upper part of the nose (the medial canthi), and headaches (J01.2/J32.2)
 Sphenoidal – can cause pain or pressure behind the eyes, but is often felt in the top of the head, over the mastoid processes, or the back of the head.

Complications 

Complications are thought to be rare (1 case per 10,000).

The proximity of the brain to the sinuses makes the most dangerous complication of sinusitis, particularly involving the frontal and sphenoid sinuses, infection of the brain by the invasion of anaerobic bacteria through the bones or blood vessels. Abscesses, meningitis, and other life-threatening conditions may result. In extreme cases, the patient may experience mild personality changes, headache, altered consciousness, visual problems, seizures, coma, and possibly death.

Sinus infection can spread through anastomosing veins or by direct extension to close structures. Orbital complications were categorized by Chandler et al. into five stages according to their severity (see table). Contiguous spread to the orbit may result in periorbital cellulitis, subperiosteal abscess, orbital cellulitis, and abscess. Orbital cellulitis can complicate acute ethmoiditis if anterior and posterior ethmoidal veins thrombophlebitis enables the spread of the infection to the lateral or orbital side of the ethmoid labyrinth. Sinusitis may extend to the central nervous system, where it may cause cavernous sinus thrombosis, retrograde meningitis, and epidural, subdural, and brain abscesses. Orbital symptoms frequently precede intracranial spread of the infection . Other complications include sinobronchitis, maxillary osteomyelitis, and frontal bone osteomyelitis. Osteomyelitis of the frontal bone often originates from a spreading thrombophlebitis. A periostitis of the frontal sinus causes an osteitis and a periostitis of the outer membrane, which produces a tender, puffy swelling of the forehead.

The diagnosis of these complications can be assisted by noting local tenderness and dull pain, and can be confirmed by CT and nuclear isotope scanning. The most common microbial causes are anaerobic bacteria and S. aureus. Treatment includes performing surgical drainage and administration of antimicrobial therapy. Surgical debridement is rarely required after an extended course of parenteral antimicrobial therapy. Chronic sinus infections may lead to mouth breathing, which can result in mouth dryness and an increased risk of gingivitis. Decongestants may also cause mouth dryness.

If an odontogenic infection involves the maxillary sinus, odontogenic sinusitis (ODS) may ensue. Odontogenic sinusitis can often spread to other sinuses such as the ethmoid, frontal and (less frequently) sphenoid sinus, and even to the contralateral nasal cavity. In rare instances, these infections may involve the orbit, causing orbital cellulitis, which may in turn result in blindness, or determine central nervous system complications such as meningitis, subdural empyema, brain abscess and life-threatening cavernous sinus thrombosis.

Infection of the eye socket is a rare complication of ethmoid sinusitis, which may result in the loss of sight and is accompanied by fever and severe illness.  Another possible complication is the infection of the bones (osteomyelitis) of the forehead and other facial bones – Pott's puffy tumor.

Voice can also get infected resulting in laryngitis. This can result in hoarseness, change in voice, pain in throat, pain while talking, inaudible voice, dry cough and fever.

Causes

Acute
Acute sinusitis is usually precipitated by an earlier upper respiratory tract infection, generally of viral origin, mostly caused by rhinoviruses (with RVA and RVC giving more severe infection than RVB), coronaviruses, and influenza viruses, others caused by adenoviruses, human parainfluenza viruses, human respiratory syncytial virus, enteroviruses other than rhinoviruses, and metapneumovirus. If the infection is of bacterial origin, the most common three causative agents are Streptococcus pneumoniae (38%), Haemophilus influenzae (36%), and Moraxella catarrhalis (16%). Until recently, H. influenzae was the most common bacterial agent to cause sinus infections. However, introduction of the H. influenzae type B (Hib) vaccine has dramatically decreased these infections and now non-typable H. influenzae (NTHI) is predominantly seen in clinics. Other sinusitis-causing bacterial pathogens include S. aureus and other streptococci species, anaerobic bacteria and, less commonly, Gram-negative bacteria. Viral sinusitis typically lasts for 7 to 10 days.

Acute episodes of sinusitis can also result from fungal invasion. These infections are typically seen in people with diabetes or other immune deficiencies (such as AIDS or transplant on immunosuppressive antirejection medications) and can be life-threatening. In type I diabetics, ketoacidosis can be associated with sinusitis due to mucormycosis.

Chronic
By definition, chronic sinusitis lasts longer than 12 weeks and can be caused by many different diseases that share chronic inflammation of the sinuses as a common symptom. It is subdivided into cases with and without polyps. When polyps are present, the condition is called chronic hyperplastic sinusitis; however, the causes are poorly understood. It may develop with anatomic derangements, including deviation of the nasal septum and the presence of concha bullosa (pneumatization of the middle concha) that inhibit the outflow of mucus, or with allergic rhinitis, asthma, cystic fibrosis, and dental infections.

Chronic rhinosinusitis represents a multifactorial inflammatory disorder, rather than simply a persistent bacterial infection. The medical management of chronic rhinosinusitis is now focused upon controlling the inflammation that predisposes people to obstruction, reducing the incidence of infections. Surgery may be needed if medications are not working.

Attempts have been made to provide a more consistent nomenclature for subtypes of chronic sinusitis. The presence of eosinophils in the mucous lining of the nose and paranasal sinuses has been demonstrated for many people, and this has been termed eosinophilic mucin rhinosinusitis (EMRS). Cases of EMRS may be related to an allergic response, but allergy is not often documented, resulting in further subcategorization into allergic and nonallergic EMRS.

A more recent, and still debated, development in chronic sinusitis is the role that fungi play in this disease. Whether fungi are a definite factor in the development of chronic sinusitis remains unclear, and if they are, what is the difference between those who develop the disease and those who remain free of symptoms. Trials of antifungal treatments have had mixed results.

Recent theories of sinusitis indicate that it often occurs as part of a spectrum of diseases that affect the respiratory tract (i.e., the "one airway" theory) and is often linked to asthma.

Both smoking and secondhand smoke are associated with chronic rhinosinusitis.

Other diseases such as cystic fibrosis and granulomatosis with polyangiitis can also cause chronic sinusitis.

Maxillary sinus
Maxillary sinusitis may also develop from problems with the teeth, and these cases were calculated to be about 40% in one study and 50% in another. The cause of this situation is usually a periapical or periodontal infection of a maxillary posterior tooth, where the inflammatory exudate has eroded through the bone superiorly to drain into the maxillary sinus.

An estimated 0.5 to 2.0% of viral rhinosinusitis (VRS) will develop into bacterial infections in adults and 5 to 10% in children.

Pathophysiology
Biofilm bacterial infections may account for many cases of antibiotic-refractory chronic sinusitis. Biofilms are complex aggregates of extracellular matrix and interdependent microorganisms from multiple species, many of which may be difficult or impossible to isolate using standard clinical laboratory techniques. Bacteria found in biofilms have their antibiotic resistance increased up to 1000 times when compared to free-living bacteria of the same species.  A recent study found that biofilms were present on the mucosa of 75% of people undergoing surgery for chronic sinusitis.

Diagnosis

Classification

Sinusitis (or rhinosinusitis) is defined as an inflammation of the mucous membrane that lines the paranasal sinuses and is classified chronologically into several categories:
 Acute sinusitis – A new infection that may last up to four weeks and can be subdivided symptomatically into severe and nonsevere. Some use definitions up to 12 weeks.
 Recurrent acute sinusitis – Four or more full episodes of acute sinusitis that occur within one year
 Subacute sinusitis – An infection that lasts between four and 12 weeks, and represents a transition between acute and chronic infection.
 Chronic sinusitis – When the signs and symptoms last for more than 12 weeks.
 Acute exacerbation of chronic sinusitis – When the signs and symptoms of chronic sinusitis exacerbate, but return to baseline after treatment.

Roughly 90% of adults have had sinusitis at some point in their lives.

Acute
Health care providers distinguish bacterial and viral sinusitis by watchful waiting. If a person has had sinusitis for fewer than 10 days without the symptoms becoming worse, then the infection is presumed to be viral. When symptoms last more than 10 days or get worse in that time, then the infection is considered bacterial sinusitis. Pain in the teeth and bad breath are also more indicative of bacterial disease.

Imaging by either X-ray, CT or MRI is generally not recommended unless complications develop. Pain caused by sinusitis is sometimes confused for pain caused by pulpitis (toothache) of the maxillary teeth, and vice versa. Classically, the increased pain when tilting the head forwards separates sinusitis from pulpitis.

For cases of maxillary sinusitis, limited field CBCT imaging, as compared to periapical radiographs, improves the ability to detect the teeth as the sources for sinusitis. A coronal CT picture may also be useful.

Chronic
For sinusitis lasting more than 12 weeks, a CT scan is recommended. On a CT scan, acute sinus secretions have a radiodensity of 10 to 25 Hounsfield units (HU), but in a more chronic state they become more viscous, with a radiodensity of 30 to 60 HU.

Nasal endoscopy and clinical symptoms are also used to make a positive diagnosis. A tissue sample for histology and cultures can also be collected and tested. Nasal endoscopy involves inserting a flexible fiber-optic tube with a light and camera at its tip into the nose to examine the nasal passages and sinuses.

Sinus infections, if they result in tooth pain, usually present with pain involving more than one of the upper teeth, whereas a toothache usually involves a single tooth. Dental examination and appropriate radiography aid in ruling out pain arises from a tooth.

Treatment

Recommended treatments for most cases of sinusitis include rest and drinking enough water to thin the mucus. Antibiotics are not recommended for most cases.

Breathing low-temperature steam such as from a hot shower or gargling can relieve symptoms. There is tentative evidence for nasal irrigation in acute sinusitis, for example during upper respiratory infections. Decongestant nasal sprays containing oxymetazoline may provide relief, but these medications should not be used for more than the recommended period. Longer use may cause rebound sinusitis. It is unclear if nasal irrigation, antihistamines, or decongestants work in children with acute sinusitis. There is no clear evidence that plant extracts such as Cyclamen europaeum are effective as an intranasal wash to treat acute sinusitis. Evidence is inconclusive on whether anti-fungal treatments improve symptoms or quality of life.

Antibiotics
Most sinusitis cases are caused by viruses and resolve without antibiotics. However, if symptoms do not resolve within 10 days, either amoxicillin or amoxicillin/clavulanate are reasonable antibiotics for first treatment with amoxicillin/clavulanate being slighlty superior to amoxicillin alone but with more side effects. A 2018 Cochrane review, however, found no evidence that people with symptoms lasting seven days or more before consulting their physician are more likely to have bacterial sinusitis as one study found that about 80% of patients have symptoms lasting more than 7 days and another about 70%. Antibiotics are specifically not recommended in those with mild / moderate disease during the first week of infection due to risk of adverse effects, antibiotic resistance, and cost.

Fluoroquinolones, and a newer macrolide antibiotic such as clarithromycin or a tetracycline like doxycycline, are used in those who have severe allergies to penicillins. Because of increasing resistance to amoxicillin the 2012 guideline of the Infectious Diseases Society of America recommends amoxicillin-clavulanate as the initial treatment of choice for bacterial sinusitis. The guidelines also recommend against other commonly used antibiotics, including azithromycin, clarithromycin, and trimethoprim/sulfamethoxazole, because of growing antibiotic resistance. The FDA recommends against the use of fluoroquinolones when other options are available due to higher risks of serious side effects.

A short-course (3–7 days) of antibiotics seems to be just as effective as the typical longer-course (10–14 days) of antibiotics for those with clinically diagnosed acute bacterial sinusitis without any other severe disease or complicating factors. The IDSA guideline suggest five to seven days of antibiotics is long enough to treat a bacterial infection without encouraging resistance. The guidelines still recommend children receive antibiotic treatment for ten days to two weeks.

Corticosteroids
For unconfirmed acute sinusitis, nasal sprays using corticosteroids have not been found to be better than a placebo either alone or in combination with antibiotics. For cases confirmed by radiology or nasal endoscopy, treatment with intranasal corticosteroids alone or in combination with antibiotics is supported. The benefit, however, is small.

For confirmed chronic rhinosinusitis, there is limited evidence that intranasal steroids improve symptoms and insufficient evidence that one type of steroid is more effective.

There is only limited evidence to support short treatment with corticosteroids by mouth for chronic rhinosinusitis with nasal polyps. There is limited evidence to support corticosteroids by mouth in combination with antibiotics for acute sinusitis; it has only short-term effect improving the symptoms.

Surgery
For sinusitis of dental origin, treatment focuses on removing the infection and preventing reinfection, by removal of the microorganisms, their byproducts, and pulpal debris from the infected root canal. Systemic antibiotics are ineffective as a definitive solution, but may afford temporary relief of symptoms by improving sinus clearing, and may be appropriate for rapidly spreading infections, but debridement and disinfection of the root canal system at the same time is necessary. Treatment options include non-surgical root canal treatment, periradicular surgery, tooth replantation, or extraction of the infected tooth.

For chronic or recurring sinusitis, referral to an otolaryngologist may be indicated, and treatment options may include nasal surgery. Surgery should only be considered for those people who do not benefit with medication. It is unclear how benefits of surgery compare to medical treatments in those with nasal polyps as this has been poorly studied.

A number of surgical approaches can be used to access the sinuses and these have generally shifted from external/extranasal approaches to intranasal endoscopic ones.  The benefit of functional endoscopic sinus surgery (FESS) is its ability to allow for a more targeted approach to the affected sinuses, reducing tissue disruption, and minimizing post-operative complications. The use of drug eluting stents such as propel mometasone furoate implant may help in recovery after surgery.

Another recently developed treatment is balloon sinuplasty. This method, similar to balloon angioplasty used to "unclog" arteries of the heart, utilizes balloons in an attempt to expand the openings of the sinuses in a less invasive manner. The effectiveness of the functional endoscopic balloon dilation approach compared to conventional FESS is not known.

Treatments directed to rhinovirus infection
A study has shown that patients given spray formulation of 0.73 mg of Tremacamra (a soluble intercellular adhesion molecule 1 [ICAM-1] receptor) reduced the severity of illness.

Prognosis
A 2018 review has found that without the use of antibiotics, about 46% were cured after one week and 64% after two weeks.

Epidemiology
Sinusitis is a common condition, with between 24 and 31 million cases occurring in the United States annually. Chronic sinusitis affects approximately 12.5% of people.

Research
Based on recent theories on the role that fungi may play in the development of chronic sinusitis, antifungal treatments have been used, on a trial basis. These trials have had mixed results.

See also 
 Fungal sinusitis

References

External links 

 
 

Nose disorders
Headaches
Inflammations
Wikipedia medicine articles ready to translate
Wikipedia emergency medicine articles ready to translate